Caprella is a large genus of skeleton shrimps belonging to the subfamily Caprellinae of the family Caprellidae. It includes approximately 170 species. The genus was first established by Jean-Baptiste Lamarck in his great work Système des animaux sans vertèbres (1801) to describe Cancer linearis (now Caprella linearis) and Squilla ventricosa (now Phtisica marina).

Caprella acanthifera Leach, 1814
Caprella acanthogaster Mayer, 1890
Caprella acanthopoda Guiler, 1954
Caprella advena Vassilenko, 1974
Caprella aino Utinomi, 1943
Caprella alaskana Mayer, 1903
Caprella alaskensis Holmes, 1904
Caprella algaceus Vassilenko, 1967
Caprella andreae Mayer, 1890
Caprella angulosa Mayer, 1903
Caprella angusta Mayer, 1903
Caprella arimotoi Takeuchi, 1993
Caprella astericola Jankowski & Vassilenko, 1973
Caprella bacillus Mayer, 1903
Caprella bathyalis Vassilenko, 1972
Caprella bathytatos Martin & Pettit, 1998
Caprella bermudia Kundel, 1910
Caprella bidentata Utinomi, 1947
Caprella bispinosa Mayer, 1903
Caprella borealis Mayer, 1903
Caprella brachiata Arimoto, 1978
Caprella branchella Arimoto, 1978
Caprella brevirostris Mayer, 1903
Caprella californica Stimpson, 1856
Caprella carina Mayer, 1903
Caprella carinata Arimoto, 1934
Caprella caulerpensis Guerra-García et al., 2002
Caprella cavediniae Krapp-Schickel & Vader, 1998
Caprella centrota Vassilenko, 1972
Caprella ceutae Guerra-García & Takeuchi, 2002
Caprella chelimana Mayer, 1903
Caprella ciliata Sars, 1883
Caprella cilluroantennata Arimoto, 1934
Caprella circur Mayer, 1903
Caprella clavigera Vassilenko, 1972
Caprella concinna Mateus & Mateus, 1991
Caprella constantina Mayer, 1903
Caprella corallina Arimoto, 1980
Caprella corvina Mayer, 1903
Caprella cristibrachium Mayer, 1903
Caprella danilevskii Czerniavskii, 1868
Caprella decipiens Mayer, 1890
Caprella dilatata Krøyer, 1843
Caprella dissona Arimoto, 1979
Caprella drepanochir Mayer, 1890
Caprella dubia Hansen, 1887
Caprella edgari Guerra-García & Takeuchi, 2004
Caprella equilibra Say, 1818
Caprella equina Arimoto, 1978
Caprella erethizon Mayer, 1901
Caprella eurydactyla Vassilenko, 1974
Caprella excelsa Vassilenko, 1974
Caprella eximia Mayer, 1890
Caprella extensimana Laubitz, 1995
Caprella falsa Mayer, 1903
Caprella ferrea Mayer, 1903
Caprella fimbriata Vassilenko, 1994
Caprella fretensis Stebbing, 1878
Caprella generosa Arimoto, 1977
Caprella gigantea Haller, 1880
Caprella gigantochir Mayer, 1903
Caprella glabra Aoki, 1991
Caprella globiceps Dana, 1853
Caprella gorgonia Laubitz & Lewbel, 1974
Caprella gracilior Mayer, 1890
Caprella gracilipes Grube, 1864
Caprella gracillima Mayer, 1890
Caprella grahami Wigley & Shave, 1966
Caprella grandimana (Mayer, 1882)
Caprella greenleyi McCain, 1969
Caprella hirayamai Guerra-García & Takeuchi, 2003
Caprella hirsuta Mayer, 1890
Caprella imaii Utinomi, 1943
Caprella incisa Mayer, 1903
Caprella indeterminata Vassilenko, 1994
Caprella inermis Grube, 1864
Caprella iniqua Arimoto, 1980
Caprella iniquilibra Mayer, 1903
Caprella innocens Mayer, 1903
Caprella insularis Laubitz, 1995
Caprella irregularis Mayer, 1890
Caprella japonica (Schurin, 1935)
Caprella kincaidi Holmes, 1904
Caprella kominatoensis Takeuchi, 1986
Caprella kroyeri De Haan, 1849
Caprella kuroshio Mori, 1999
Caprella laevipes Mayer, 1903

Caprella laeviuscula Mayer, 1903
Caprella liliata Arimoto, 1979
Caprella lilliput Krapp-Schickel & Ruffo, 1987
Caprella linearis (Linnaeus, 1767)
Caprella liparotensis Haller, 1879
Caprella litoralis Vassilenko, 1972
Caprella longicirrata Vassilenko, 1974
Caprella longidentata Arimoto, 1934
Caprella longimanus Stimpson, 1853
Caprella luctator Stimpsom, 1855
Caprella lukini Vassilenko, 1974
Caprella madrasana Giles, 1890
Caprella manneringi McCain, 1979
Caprella mantis Latreille, 1816
Caprella media Vassilenko, 1974
Caprella mendax Mayer, 1903
Caprella microtuberculata G.O. Sars, 1879
Caprella minima Arimoto, 1980
Caprella minuscula Arimoto, 1980
Caprella mitis Mayer, 1890
Caprella mixta Mayer, 1903
Caprella modesta Herklots, 1861
Caprella monai Guerra-García et al., 2001
Caprella monoceros Mayer, 1890
Caprella multituberculum Lee & Lee, 1996
Caprella mutica Schurin, 1935
Caprella nagaoi Arimoto, 1970
Caprella natalensis Mayer, 1903
Caprella nichtensis Brandt, 1851
Caprella obtusifrons Utinomi, 1943
Caprella okadai Arimoto, 1930
Caprella oxyarthra Vassilenko, 1974
Caprella pacifica Vassilenko, 1972
Caprella palkii Giles, 1890
Caprella paramitisGuerra-García et al., 2001
Caprella parapaulina Vassilenko, 1974
Caprella paulina Mayer, 1903
Caprella penantis Leach, 1814
Caprella pilidigitata Laubitz, 1970
Caprella pilipalma Dougherty & Steinberg, 1953
Caprella pinnigera Arimoto, 1980
Caprella polyacantha Utinomi, 1947
Caprella pseudorapax Guerra-García et al., 2001
Caprella pustulata Laubitz, 1970
Caprella rapax Mayer, 1890
Caprella rhinoceros Mayer, 1903
Caprella rhopalochir Mayer, 1903
Caprella rinki Stephensen, 1916
Caprella rotundidentata Vassilenko, 1972
Caprella rudiscula Laubitz, 1970
Caprella sabineae Guerra-García & García-Gómez, 2003
Caprella sabulensis Guerra-García et al., 2001
Caprella sanguinea Gould, 1841
Caprella santosrosai Sanchez-Moyano et al., 1995
Caprella sarsi Honeyman, 1889
Caprella scabra Holmes, 1904
Caprella scaura Templeton, 1836
Caprella scitula Arimoto & Hirayama, 1979
Caprella sedovi Gurjanova, 1933
Caprella septentrionalis Krøyer, 1838
Caprella simia Mayer, 1903
Caprella simplex Mayer, 1890
Caprella singularis Mayer, 1903
Caprella soyo Arimoto, 1934
Caprella stella Krapp-Schickel & Vader, 1998
Caprella striata Mayer, 1903
Caprella subinermis Mayer, 1890
Caprella subtilis Mayer, 1903
Caprella takeuchi Guerra-García et al., 2001
Caprella tasmaniensis Guiler, 1954
Caprella telarpax Mayer, 1890
Caprella temperativa Arimoto, 1982
Caprella tenella (Dana, 1853)
Caprella tenuis Haswell, 1880
Caprella traudlae Guerra-Garcia, 2004
Caprella triodos Stebbing, 1910
Caprella trispinisHoneyman, 1889
Caprella tsugarensis Utinomi, 1947
Caprella tuberculata Guérin, 1836
Caprella ungulina Mayer, 1903
Caprella unica Mayer, 1903
Caprella uniforma La Follette, 1915
Caprella vana Mayer, 1903
Caprella venusta Utinomi, 1943
Caprella verrucosa Boeck, 1871
Caprella vidua Mayer, 1903
Caprella vitjazi Vassilenko, 1992
Caprella wirtzi Krapp-Schickel & Takeuchi, 2005
Caprella zygodonta Vassilenko, 1974

References

External links

Corophiidea